The theory of a Juvenile Liaison Officer scheme in the Republic of Ireland was put forward to the Minister for Justice Gerry Collins in 1985 (Revision). It has since been passed and is similar to the ASBO scheme in the UK. The main difference is that a JLO can only be given to an underage offender (-18).

How you are given a JLO 
A JLO is basically an assigned officer in a Garda district that assists in helping an underage offender not to succeed in other offences. There are many different ways that an underage person may receive one. They are mainly given out to repeated offenders of petty crimes including vandalism, underage drinking, not keeping the peace etc. If you are caught after a serious offence they are generally given out. You are normally arrested by the Garda officer that catches you offending. Your name is generally taken and your parents or guardians are contacted. A form which is filled out by the arresting officer warranting the JLO is sent to Harcourt Street Garda HQ.

Now what? 
A few weeks later the J.Lo from your district or the Garda district involved in filing the form calls to your residence where he will then talk to the parents/guardians and then yourself. If you are only a first time offender, they generally give you a warning and do not come back again (this depends on how serious the offence). But if you are a repeated offender, they are regular visitors, generally coming every 2 weeks or so and calling your residence to check up on what you have been up to. Your passport is then 'censored' which means that you cannot leave the EU until you reach the age of 18.

Law 
When an underage offender reaches the age of 18, their file is wiped clean of the offences and they are no longer 'marked' men. If you are a repeated offender (normally with 4 filed offences) you may have to appear in court on the basis of a criminal conviction. This stays on your record for life.

References 
Dáil Éireann - Volume 359 - 6 June 1985
Written Answers. - Juvenile Liaison Officer Scheme.

Crime in the Republic of Ireland